Keziah Goodwyn Hopkins Brevard House, also known as Alwehav ("All We Have"), is a historic plantation house located in rural Richland County, South Carolina, near Eastover. The original house was built about 1820, and enlarged to its present size about 1850. It is a large, two-story, vernacular Greek Revival style residence with Italianate features.  Also on the property are the remnants of a water tower (c. 1908), a frame stable, a barn, three frame sheds, a well, and four modern shed buildings. The property also has a number of unique horticultural specimens.

It was added to the National Register of Historic Places in 1986.  Keziah Brevard was a widowed plantation mistress.

References

Houses on the National Register of Historic Places in South Carolina
Greek Revival houses in South Carolina
Italianate architecture in South Carolina
Houses completed in 1850
Houses in Richland County, South Carolina
National Register of Historic Places in Richland County, South Carolina